Roberto Jan Hilbert (born 16 October 1984) is a German former professional footballer. At international level, he earned eight caps with the Germany national team and twelve caps with the U21 team.

Club career
Born in Forchheim, West Germany, Hilbert played for local club SpVgg Jahn Forchheim In his youth before playing for the youth teams of 1. FC Nürnberg and SpVgg Greuther Fürth. In 2002, he was transferred to 1. SC Feucht in the fourth-tier Bayernliga, where he was one of the key players and started his professional career. After his club was promoted to the third-tier Regionalliga the following season, he scored ten goals in 26 games.

On the basis of this performances at Feucht, Greuther Fürth re-signed him where he played in the 2. Bundesliga. In the 2005–06 season, he played in 34 games, scoring three times.

In the summer of 2006, Hilbert joined top Bundesliga side VfB Stuttgart. In his first season at Stuttgart, he became a regular in the first team which won the club's first championship in 15 years in May 2007. He usually played in right midfield, but is some times used as a right-back. After the injury of key striker Mario Gómez in the final phase of the 2007 championship, Hilbert played a more offensive part for several weeks and scored a number of decisive goals. He finished as Stuttgart's third best goalscorer, scoring seven times, like his teammate Thomas Hitzlsperger.

On 22 June 2010, Hilbert signed a three-year contract with Beşiktaş. He scored his first goal for Beşiktaş against HJK Helsinki in the first leg of UEFA Europa League match on 17 August 2010.

On 12 July 2013, Bayer Leverkusen announced on their homepage that they signed Hilbert on a free transfer. Hilbert was given a two-year contract. At the end of the 2016–17 season, he left the club after four years.

In October 2017, free agent Hilbert joined former club Greuther Fürth for a second stint there, signing a two-year contract.

On 6 January 2019, it was announced that Hilbert finished his active professional career and from now on would play for the reserve team of Greuther Fürth. He was also going to do an apprenticeship as an athletic trainer.

International career
Hilbert has also made twelve appearances in the Germany U21 team, scoring three times. He made his international debut for the Germany national team in a friendly against Denmark on 28 March 2007.

Career statistics

Club

Honours
VfB Stuttgart
Bundesliga: 2006–07

Beşiktaş
Turkish Cup: 2010–11

References

External links
 

1984 births
Living people
People from Forchheim
Sportspeople from Upper Franconia
Association football fullbacks
Association football midfielders
German footballers
Germany international footballers
Germany under-21 international footballers
SpVgg Greuther Fürth players
VfB Stuttgart players
Beşiktaş J.K. footballers
Bayer 04 Leverkusen players
Bundesliga players
2. Bundesliga players
Süper Lig players
German expatriate footballers
Expatriate footballers in Turkey
German expatriate sportspeople in Turkey
Footballers from Bavaria